Jorge Luis García Rivas (born 22 January 2002) is a Mexican professional footballer who plays as a defensive midfielder for Liga MX club Cruz Azul.

Career statistics

Club

Honours
Cruz Azul
Liga MX: Guardianes 2021
Copa MX: Apertura 2018
Supercopa de la Liga MX: 2022

References

External links
 
 
 

Living people
2002 births
Mexico youth international footballers
Association football defenders
Cruz Azul footballers
Liga MX players
Footballers from Hidalgo (state)
Sportspeople from Pachuca
Mexican footballers